Alexander David Goode (born 7 May 1988) is an English professional rugby union player playing for Saracens in Premiership Rugby.

Biography
All-rounder Goode appeared at the national schools athletics finals, played county tennis and was part of the Ipswich Town football academy before joining Saracens.

He is the nephew of Jo Goode, who won an Olympic bronze in Badminton in Sydney.

A fly half by trade, he moved to full back and has played the majority of his games for Saracens in these positions.

He was educated at St Faith's School, The Leys School and Oakham School, and at the University of Hertfordshire.

Club career
He joined the academy structure at Saracens ahead of the 2006–2007 season, and made his club debut against Bristol. He has since signed several contract extensions. He was awarded the 2019 European Player of the Year award. During his time at Saracens he has won five Premiership titles in 2011, 2015, 2016, 2018 and 2019, with Goode featuring in all five finals and scoring a try in the 2016 final. He also helped Saracens win the European Champions Cup in 2016, 2017 and 2019, scoring a try in the 2017 final.

He spent a season on loan to Japanese side NEC Green Rockets while Saracens competed in the 2020–21 RFU Championship. After Saracens' quick return he returned to them for the following season.

He has since become the most capped Saracens player in their history - with 339 appearances for the London club.

International career
Goode represented England at Under 16A and Under 18 level. Goode played at the 2007 Under 19 Rugby World Championship.
In 2008 Goode was a member of the England under-20 team that won the grand slam and reached the final of the 2008 IRB Junior World Championship.
In January 2009 Goode made his debut for the England Saxons, against .

On 16 June 2012 Goode made his test debut for England against South Africa, coming off the bench on 16 June 2012 in a 36–27 loss.
Goode was part of the squad selected for the 2012 Autumn internationals, because of injuries to Ben Foden he started all four of the games at full back. He played well enough to earn himself QBE Man of the Match in England's 54–12 win over Fiji.

Goode also featured in the 2013 Six Nations Championship, playing all five games including the Grand Slam decider at Cardiff's Millennium Stadium. Unfortunately a shoulder injury and subsequent reconstructive surgery sidelined him for England's summer tour to Argentina.

International tries

References

External links
Saracens profile
England profile
ESPN profile

1988 births
Living people
Alumni of the University of Hertfordshire
Cambridge R.U.F.C. players
English rugby union players
Rugby union players from Cambridge
People educated at Oakham School
People educated at The Leys School
Saracens F.C. players
England international rugby union players
Rugby union fly-halves